Arena Ursynów is an indoor arena located in Warsaw, Poland. It is used as an exhibition complex, theater and sports arena. In a  sports setting, the arena has a capacity of 2,000 people. Sports that are being played at the Arena Ursynów include basketball, volleyball and badminton.

Notable events

References

Indoor arenas in Poland
Basketball venues in Poland
Sports venues in Warsaw
Buildings and structures in Warsaw